John Hill (July 18, 1800 – April 19, 1880) was a U.S. Representative from Virginia, cousin of John Thomas Harris.

Biography
Born in New Canton, Virginia, Hill completed preparatory studies and was graduated from Washington Academy (now Washington and Lee University), Lexington, Virginia, in 1818.  He studied law and was admitted to the bar in 1821.

Hill was elected as a Whig to the Twenty-sixth Congress (March 4, 1839 – March 3, 1841).  He was an unsuccessful candidate for reelection in 1840 to the Twenty-seventh Congress.

Hill then resumed the practice of law.  He served as member of the Virginia constitutional convention in 1850–1851.
He worked as a Commonwealth attorney for several years, before becoming county judge of Buckingham County from 1870 to 1879.

He died at Buckingham Court House, Virginia, April 19, 1880.  He was interred in the Presbyterian Cemetery.

Electoral history

1839; Hill was elected to the U.S. House of Representatives with 54.12% of the vote, defeating Democrat Daniel A. Wilson.

Sources

1800 births
1880 deaths
Virginia lawyers
Virginia state court judges
Washington and Lee University alumni
Whig Party members of the United States House of Representatives from Virginia
19th-century American politicians
People from Buckingham County, Virginia
19th-century American judges